Events from the year 1918 in Sweden

Incumbents
 Monarch – Gustaf V
 Prime Minister - Nils Edén

Events

 14 March – Eva Andén is elected the first female member of the Swedish Bar Association.
 14 June - The Poor Care Regulation of 1918 replaces the Poor Care Regulation of 1871: it abolishes the poor houses, the Rotegång, Poor Auctions, and other outdated poor care methods.
 The forced registration and medical examination system of prostitutes is abolished. The Svenska Federationen, having reached its goal, is therefore dissolved.

Births

 16 January – Allan Ekelund, film producer
 17 May - Birgit Nilsson, operatic soprano
 14 July - Ingmar Bergman, director, writer, and producer in film, television, theater, and radio

Deaths

 3 April – Olof Palme, historian  (born 1884)
 Hulda Mellgren, industrialist (born 1839)

References

 
Years of the 20th century in Sweden
Sweden